David Mays is a journalist and magazine proprietor.

David or Dave Mays may also refer to:

 David J. Mays (1896–1971), lawyer and 1953 Pulitzer Prize winner
 Dave Mays (baseball) (1910–1993), American baseball player
 Dave Mays (born 1949), American football quarterback

See also
David May (disambiguation)